Emilia Nova (born 20 August 1995) is an Indonesian athlete competing in hurdling. She won the silver medal in the women's 100 metres hurdles event at the 2018 Asian Games held in Jakarta, Indonesia.

Career 
At the 2019 Southeast Asian Games held in the Philippines, she won the gold medal in the women's 100 metres hurdles event. Two years earlier, at the 2017 Southeast Asian Games held in Kuala Lumpur, Malaysia, she won the silver medal in the heptathlon event.

In 2019, she competed in the women's 100 metres hurdles event at the Asian Athletics Championships held in Doha, Qatar where she failed to qualify to compete in the final. Later that year, she also competed in the women's 100 metres hurdles at the 2019 Summer Universiade held in Naples, Italy. Here she failed to qualify to compete in the semifinals.

Competition record

References

External links 
 

1995 births
Living people
Sportspeople from Jakarta
Indonesian female hurdlers
Athletes (track and field) at the 2018 Asian Games
Asian Games medalists in athletics (track and field)
Asian Games silver medalists for Indonesia
Medalists at the 2018 Asian Games
Southeast Asian Games medalists in athletics
Southeast Asian Games gold medalists for Indonesia
Southeast Asian Games silver medalists for Indonesia
Competitors at the 2017 Southeast Asian Games
Competitors at the 2019 Southeast Asian Games
Competitors at the 2019 Summer Universiade
Competitors at the 2021 Southeast Asian Games
Islamic Solidarity Games competitors for Indonesia
Islamic Solidarity Games medalists in athletics
21st-century Indonesian women